Sthiramati (Sanskrit; Chinese:安慧; Tibetan: blo gros brtan pa) or Sāramati was a 6th-century Indian Buddhist scholar-monk. Sthiramati was a contemporary of Dharmapala based primarily in Valābhi university (present-day Gujarat), although he is thought to have spent some time at Nālandā. He was renowned for his numerous and detailed commentaries on Yogācāra and Abhidharma, works by Vasubandhu and others, as well as for a commentary on the Kaśyāpa-parivarta. He was a student of the Valābhi Yogacara scholar Gunamati.

Takasaki is certain that the author of the embedded commentary (verse and prose) to the core text (verse) of the Ratnagotravibhāga [RGV version as per Johnston] is Sāramati through his analysis of the RGV with the Dharmadhātvaviśeṣaśāstra.

Sthiramati wrote ten surviving commentaries on various Buddhist treatises:

 The Explication of the Compendium of the Abhidharma (Abhidharmasamuccayavyākhyā; currently in Sanskrit, Tibetan, and Chinese)
 The Commentary on the Treasury of Abhidharma [Called] True Reality (Tattvārthā Abhidharmakośaṭīkā, survives in full Tibetan translation and some parts in Sanskrit)
 The Commentary on the Treatise on the Five Constituents (Pañcaskandhakavibhāṣā; survives in Sanskrit and Tibetan)
 The Commentary on the Treatise on Mental Presentation in Thirty Verses (Triṃśikāvijñaptibhāṣya; survives in Sanskrit and Tibetan)
 The Commentary on the Distinguishing of the Middle from the Extremes (Madhyāntavibhāgaṭīkā; survives in Sanskrit and Tibetan)
 The Commentary on the Comments to the Ornament of [Mahāyāna] Sūtras (*Sūtrālaṃkāravṛttibhāṣya; survives in Tibetan)
 The Commentary on the Kāśyapa Chapter (*Kāśyapaparivartaṭīkā; survives in Tibetan and Chinese)
 The Commentary on the Mahāyāna Madhyamaka (Dasheng zhongguan shilun 大乘中觀釋論; survives in Chinese)
 The Commentary on the Exposition of Akṣayamati (*Akṣayamatinirdeśaṭīkā; survives in Tibetan)
 A commentary on the Collection of Means of Knowledge (Pramanasamuccaya; currently lost).

References

6th-century Buddhist monks
6th-century Indian scholars
6th-century Indian writers
Monks of Nalanda
Indian Buddhist monks
Indian scholars of Buddhism
Indian Theravada Buddhists